Charles Robinson III (born December 14, 1994) is an American professional baseball catcher in the Cincinnati Reds organization.

Amateur career
Robinson grew up in Danville, Illinois and attended Danville High School.

Robinson played college baseball for the Southern Miss Golden Eagles for three seasons. He was the team's backup catcher during his first two seasons with the team. After his sophomore season, he played collegiate summer baseball with the Ocean State Waves of the New England Collegiate Baseball League. As a junior, Robinson batted .288 with seven home runs and 44 runs batted in (RBIs) and was named first team All-Conference USA.

Professional career

Houston Astros
The Houston Astros selected Robinson in the 21st round of the 2016 Major League Baseball draft. After signing with the team, he was assigned to the Tri-City ValleyCats of the New York–Penn League. Robinson spent the 2017 season with the Class A Quad Cities River Bandits. He played for the Buies Creek Astros of the Class A-Advanced Carolina League and batted .239 with seven home runs and 30 RBIs. Robinson spent the 2019 season with the Double-A Corpus Christi Hooks and hit .217 with seven home runs and 36 RBIs in 103 games played. After the season, he played winter league baseball for the Canberra Cavalry of the Australian Baseball League.

Cincinnati Reds
The Cincinnati Reds selected Robinson in the minor league phase of the 2020 Rule 5 draft. He spent the 2021 with the Double-A Chattanooga Lookouts and batted .248 with eight home runs and 24 RBIs in 66 games played. Robinson was assigned to Chattanooga at the beginning of the 2022 season before being promoted to the Triple-A Louisville Bats.

Robinson was promoted to the Reds' major league roster on August 11, 2022. He made his Major League debut on August 24, 2022, starting at catcher and going 1-2 with one run scored in a 7-5 loss to the Philadelphia Phillies. Robinson's debut was the first time that an African-American player had started at catcher since Bruce Maxwell had in 2018. He elected free agency on November 10, 2022. On December 5, 2022, Robinson resigned to the Reds on a minor league deal with an invite to spring training.

Personal life
Robinson's father, Charles Robinson Jr., played catcher in the minor leagues in the Kansas City Royals and Chicago Cubs organizations. His grandfather, Charles Robinson Sr., was also a minor league catcher in the Chicago White Sox organization.

References

External links

Southern Miss Golden Eagles bio

1994 births
Living people
People from Danville, Illinois
Baseball players from Illinois
African-American baseball players
Major League Baseball catchers
Cincinnati Reds players
Southern Miss Golden Eagles baseball players
Tri-City ValleyCats players
Quad Cities River Bandits players
Buies Creek Astros players
Corpus Christi Hooks players
Chattanooga Lookouts players
Louisville Bats players
Canberra Cavalry players